Braehead (Gaelic: Ceann a' Bhruthaich) is a commercial development located at the former site of Braehead Power Station in Renfrew on the south bank of the River Clyde in Renfrew, Renfrewshire. It is particularly notable for its large shopping centre, arena and leisure facilities.

The area is known for its shopping centre of the same name, which was rebranded as Intu Braehead in 2013 and carried that name until 2020. The rebranding was done as part of a corporate rebranding exercise by Capital Shopping Centres plc, which itself was renamed as Intu Properties PLC.

King's Inch
Until at least the 18th century, the site was an island in the River Clyde, called King's Inch (a name that is preserved in the name of the road that bisects the site).

The original castle at Renfrew was built on King's Inch in the 12th century by Walter Fitz-Alan, High Steward of Scotland. It was abandoned in the 13th century and replaced by a stone castle in what is now the centre of Renfrew. In the latter half of the 15th century, Sir John Ross was granted the lands of Inch with the ruins of this castle, upon which he built a three-storey castle known as the Inch Castle.

In 1769, the King's Inch was purchased by Glasgow tobacco merchant Alexander Speirs, who demolished Inch Castle in order to build a country mansion, Elderslie House. Completed in 1782 (demolished in 1924), Elderslie House was designed by Robert Adam.

Braehead power station

The power station was built after World War II. It remained operational into the 1980s and was demolished in the 1990s.

The Braehead explosion
On 4 January 1977, a serious fire and explosion occurred at a warehouse in the Braehead Container Clearance Depot, adjacent to the Power Station. The fire was started accidentally by three boys who had lit a fire to warm themselves at a den that they had made, during the New Year holiday, from cardboard cartons stacked beside the warehouse. The fire detonated 70 tonnes of Sodium Chlorate weedkiller stored in the warehouse, producing a blast estimated by HM Inspectorate of Explosives as being equivalent to up to 820 kg of TNT.

The explosion was heard across the whole Greater Glasgow area, sent flying debris up to 2.8 km away, shattered windows in about 200 shops and houses in Renfrew and Clydebank, and caused an estimated £6 million of damage. In large part due to the National Bank Holiday in observance of Hogmanay celebrations, there were no deaths. Twelve people required treatment for shock and minor injuries.

Renfrew Riverside redevelopment
Braehead forms part of the Renfrew Riverside redevelopment area, a part of the wider Clyde Waterfront Regeneration project. The Braehead area includes:
an indoor shopping centre;
ice skating / curling facilities;
Krispy Kreme doughnuts;
The Braehead Arena - along with extensive covered and open-air car parking);
A Xsite (formerly Xscape and Soar) adventure complex;
A small business park.

Braehead shopping centre

The shopping centre opened in September 1999 and comprises  of retail and leisure floorspace. The centre has 110 shops in the main covered mall, and a further 10 in a retail park of larger stores. Braehead is also home to Renfrew's IKEA store, which opened in September 2001 and sits near the King George V Dock. At , it is the largest IKEA store in Scotland and at the time of opening was the largest in the United Kingdom. Since opening, the centre has proved popular with consumers, and it has even been blamed for a downturn in the fortunes of shops in nearby Paisley, Govan and Renfrew.

Sited within the same building as the shopping centre is the Braehead Arena and other facilities including an ice rink. In 2000, its curling facilities hosted the World Championships, and in 2005 they were used as training facilities when the Women's World Championships were being held in Paisley.

On 7 October 2011, a father was stopped by security and questioned by police under anti-terror legislation after photographing his daughter at an ice-cream stall. This resulted in a social media backlash and statements from both Braehead's management and Strathclyde Police.

As of January 2013, a planning application was submitted to Renfrewshire Council for 'permission in principle' to build a new mixed-use development at the centre.

In 2018 Braehead was named the top Scottish shopping centre in a GlobalData report.

Following Intu Properties plc entering administration in June 2020, a subsidiary of the company called Intu SGS received funding to take full control of the centre along with Lakeside, Victoria Centre and Intu Watford. The transfer from Intu to Intu SGS is expected to take place by the end of 2020, and will involve Global Mutual becoming asset manager of the centres and Savills serving as property manager.
In 2020 it was reported that Braehead Shopping Centre was trialling the use of full-body security scanners at the entrance.

Clydebuilt, Braehead
From September 1999 to October 2010, the Scottish Maritime Museum operated Clydebuilt at Braehead, a museum which explored the history of the Clyde shipbuilding industry and the industrial development of Glasgow and the River Clyde.

The museum had been built by and was subsidised by the owners of the shopping centre, but after they withdrew support the museum became financially unviable and Scottish Maritime Museum were forced to close it and transfer its exhibits to their other sites at Irvine and Dumbarton.

The building is now occupied by Krispy Kreme.

Xsite Braehead
Xsite Braehead (formerly known as Intu Braehead Soar and Xscape Braehead) began construction in November 2004 and was opened in March 2006 with its main use to teach people how to ski or snowboard. The building has a conventional shape, with the ski slope accommodated by a sloped cuboid structure projecting out the roof. The complex features a variety of entertainment activities, including an indoor ski slope, rock climbing, an Odeon, bowling, RoboCoaster, mini golf and laser tag, as well as a variety of shops, restaurants, and bars.

The Snow Factor indoor snow slope features a 168 m main slope with an additional  dedicated beginners' area for ski and snowboard lessons. On the main slope, two Poma button lifts give a drag tow to the top and can be exited either at the halfway point on the slope or at the top. Rope tows are used on the beginners slope.

Skiers and boarders may hire equipment. Sledging and an ice slide are also provided.

Lessons can be booked for both boarding and skiing. Beginners start on the exclusive teaching slope before moving to the main slope, first using half its length and then advancing to using the full slope. Once passed at the ability to ski or board from the full length of the slope, the pupil is allowed full access.

Clothing can be hired for a nominal charge, but gloves must be purchased unless provided by the attendee. There are also helmets available for free use.

In March 2006, weeks before the complex was scheduled to open, the roof of screen seven of the Odeon fell in and required extensive re-building.
The mini-golf (which is housed below the cinema) opened in July 2006. The cinema opened on 19 October 2007, 18 months later than planned. "Stardust" was the first film shown. The cinema is fitted with Real D (also known as Disney Digital 3D technology) in screen 7, and is also capable of showing IMAX films. The cinema held the Scottish Pink Carpet Premiere of Universal Pictures film "Wild Child" on 30 July 2008. Both stars of the film, Emma Roberts and Alex Pettyfer, attended.

In December 2011, SNO! Zone Braehead was acquired by the Ice Factor Group and renamed Snow Factor.

In March 2018, an 18 metre high slide, known as The Big Slide, opened to the general public. It is the tallest indoor slide in the UK.

Further development
To the west of Braehead and adjacent to the town of Renfrew is the Renfrew Riverside area. Between the residential area and the shopping centre an Xscape complex (now named Xsite), providing an indoor ski slope and other entertainments and leisure facilities opened in early 2006.

To the south of the shopping centre is a small development called Braehead Business Park.

Transport
Braehead can be reached from Junctions 25a (westbound) and 26 (eastbound) of the M8 motorway, and has extensive public transport connections including its own bus station. Buses run from many areas linking Braehead to Largs, Greenock, Paisley, Glasgow, Erskine and Johnstone. The Pride of the Clyde ferry service ran from Glasgow City Centre to Braehead's pier down the River Clyde regularly until October 2007.

Boundary dispute
After opening in 1999, Braehead was the subject of a boundary dispute between the Glasgow and Renfrewshire council areas, as originally the council boundary line divided the shopping centre in two. In 2002, a Local Government Boundary Commission ruling eventually redrew the boundary to include all of the centre in Renfrewshire, as this was the original ancient boundary. The boundary runs along Kings Inch Drive and is marked by a chain linked fence at this point.

References

External links

 Intu Braehead
 Braehead Business Parks
 Clyde Waterfront

Shopping centres in Scotland
Buildings and structures in Renfrewshire
Shopping malls established in 1999
1999 establishments in Scotland
Tourist attractions in Renfrewshire
Buildings and structures in Glasgow
Indoor ski resorts
Ski areas and resorts in Scotland
Greater Glasgow
Renfrew